Tokyo Smoke is a Canadian lifestyle brand owned by OEG Inc. that focuses on the legal recreational cannabis industry. The company was co-founded by father and son Lorne and Alan Gertner in 2015.

History

Tokyo Smoke was co-founded by Lorne and Alan Gertner in 2015. Lorne Gertner had founded Canada’s first legal medical marijuana grower, Cannasat Therapeutics, in 2004. The brand’s first location, Tokyo Smoke Found, opened in April 2015 in Toronto’s West Queen West neighbourhood. In early 2017, the company acquired another cannabis company, Van der Pop, based in Seattle and is targeted towards women.

At the 2017 Canadian Cannabis awards, Tokyo Smoke won the award for "Brand of the Year."

On December 21, 2017, the company announced that it would merge with DOJA Cannabis and form a new company called Hiku Brands Company Ltd. On July 10, 2018, Canopy Growth acquired Hiku brands and absorbed its portfolio of brands.

On August 14, 2019, Acreage announced its intention to open cannabis stores under the Tokyo Smoke brand in the United States.

In November 2021, Tokyo Smoke and UberEats struck a deal for users to be able to order cannabis for pick-up through the app.

OEG Inc. acquired the Tokyo Smoke brand in 2022.

Retail Stores 
Tokyo Smoke currently operates 7 cannabis dispensaries in Manitoba, 6 dispensaries in Alberta, and 27 in Ontario.  The company no longer operates its 3 coffee shops: 2 in Toronto, and 1 in Calgary.    These coffee shops did not sell cannabis, instead, they sold coffee, cafe food, and cannabis accessories.  In September 2018, Tokyo Smoke announced that they have received approval to build up to 10 cannabis stores in Manitoba. In Ontario, where licensed producers are restricted from owning more than 9.9 per cent of a cannabis store, Canopy Growth has entered into branding agreements with retail license owners to open stores under the Tokyo Smoke name.

References

External links

Coffeehouses and cafés in Canada
Cannabis companies of Canada
Companies based in Toronto
2015 in cannabis